Laslo Đere was the defending champion, but withdrew with an abdominal injury before the tournament began. 

Cristian Garín won the title, defeating Gianluca Mager in the final, 7–6(7–3), 7–5.

This was the first Clay Court tournament where players were allowed to use the challenge system.

The tournament was notable for being the first ATP tour level event for future World No.1 Carlos Alcaraz. He reached the second round, after a win over compatriot Albert Ramos Viñolas.

Seeds

Draw

Finals

Top half

Bottom half

Qualifying

Seeds

Qualifiers

Lucky losers

Qualifying draw

First qualifier

Second qualifier

Third qualifier

Fourth qualifier

References

External Links
 Main draw
 Qualifying draw

Rio Open - Singles
2020 in Brazilian tennis
Rio Open